The First presidency of Lula da Silva corresponds to the period in Brazilian political history that began with the inauguration of Luiz Inácio Lula da Silva as President on January 1, 2003, in his fourth candidacy for this office and after defeating the PSDB candidate, José Serra, with 61.27% of the valid votes in a second round. Lula was the first former worker to become president of Brazil, and he governed the country for two consecutive terms (2003 until 2007
, and from 2007 until 2011). In October 2006, Lula was reelected to the presidency, defeating the PSDB candidate Geraldo Alckmin in the second round, obtaining more than 60% of the valid votes against 39.17% for his opponent. His term in office ended on January 1, 2011. Lula's government ended with record approval from the population, with more than 80% positive ratings.

Its main hallmarks were the maintenance of economic stability, the resumption of the country's growth, and the reduction of poverty and social inequality. His first presidency registered the highest average GDP growth in two decades, around 4.1%, and total growth was 32.62%. Per capita income grew 23.05%, with an average of 2.8%. The growth was driven by the rise in commodity prices, domestic demand, helped by programs like Bolsa Família and the reduction in international interest rates. Despite economic growth, productivity has not increased along with it. Lula took office with inflation at 12.53% and delivered at 5.90%.

One of Lula's campaign platforms was the need for constitutional reforms. A relevant reform that took place during Lula's government was the approval of Constitutional Amendment 45, in 2004, which became known as the "Judiciary Reform". 

His first presidency was also notable for the country's quest to host major sporting events. The 2007 Pan-American Games took place during his mandate. So did the choice of Brazil to host the 2014 FIFA World Cup and the 2016 Olympic Games. The decisions generated controversy about the losses and legacies of each event.

In 2009, the penultimate year of the Lula administration, an annual study conducted by the NGO Transparency International reported that Brazil ranked 75th in a ranking of 180 countries on perceived corruption. The study gave Brazil a score of 3.7, which indicates corruption problems, according to the entity. Brazil got worse in the ranking between 2002 (score 4.0, 45th in the ranking) and 2009 (score 3.7, 75th in the ranking), having dropped 30 places. In 2008, the Democracy Index, elaborated annually by the British magazine The Economist, ranked Brazil as the 41st most democratic country in the world.

Letter to the Brazilian people
Still during the election campaign, Lula wrote the  where he assured that in case of his victory his party, the Workers', would respect national and international contracts. The letter was read on June 22, 2002 during a meeting about the party's government program.

Inaugurations

Luiz Inácio Lula da Silva took office on January 1, 2003, having been elected president in 2002. He was the second Brazilian president to take office on this date, the third president elected since the end of the military dictatorship, and the first socialist-oriented former worker to assume the Presidency of Brazil.

The inauguration for Luiz Inácio Lula da Silva's second term as president of the Federative Republic of Brazil took place on January 1, 2007. He was sworn in again with the vice-president, José Alencar. The ceremony began shortly after 4pm in the plenary of the National Congress in Brasilia and was presided over by then Senate President Renan Calheiros. As in the inauguration of the first mandate, the reelected president and vice-president read and signed the term of office, and then the national anthem was played by the Marine Band.

Internal policy

Economy

Lula was elected in a difficult economic context, and his administration began by following the economic policy of the previous government, FHC. To this end, he nominated Henrique Meirelles, a federal deputy elected by the PSDB of Goiás in 2002, to head the Brazilian Central Bank, sending a strong signal to the market - especially the international market, where Meirelles is well known for having been the president of Bank Boston - that there would be no abrupt changes in the conduct of economic policy in his government. He appointed Antônio Palocci, a sanitarian physician and former mayor of Ribeirão Preto, a member of the Workers' Party, as Minister of Finance. His replacement was the economist and university professor Guido Mantega, who took over the ministry on March 27, 2006. 

The Lula administration was characterized by low inflation, which was under control, reduction in unemployment and constant records in the balance of trade. During President Lula's administration there was a record production in the automobile industry in 2005, the largest real growth in the minimum wage and reduction of the Gini coefficient.

In 2010, Alan Mulally, Ford's global president, stated that thanks to the incentive programs of Lula's government, it was possible for the country to effectively come out of the world crisis. During the crisis the GDP retraction was only 0.2%, showing a better result than the major economies of the world.

The economic growth was driven by the commodities boom, the reduction in international interest rates, and the increase in domestic consumption, supported by the increase in the minimum wage and income transfer programs such as Bolsa Família.

See also
Second presidency of Lula da Silva
Lulism
Politics of Brazil
Workers' Party (Brazil)
List of scandals in Brazil

References

Bibliography

2003 establishments in Brazil
2010 disestablishments in Brazil
2000s in Brazilian politics
2010s in Brazilian politics
Silva
Presidency